Leo John Norris (May 17, 1908 - May 13, 1987) was a Major League Baseball player for the Philadelphia Phillies in the 1936-1937 seasons. He was born in Bay St. Louis, Mississippi and he died in Zachary, Louisiana.

References

Major League Baseball infielders
Philadelphia Phillies players
Baseball players from Mississippi
People from Bay St. Louis, Mississippi
1908 births
1987 deaths
Nashville Vols players